Laze nad Krko is a dispersed settlement in the hills south of Krka in the Municipality of Ivančna Gorica in central Slovenia. The area is part of the historical region of Lower Carniola. The municipality is now included in the Central Slovenia Statistical Region.

Name
The name of the settlement was changed from Laze to Laze nad Krko in 1953.

References

External links

Laze nad Krko on Geopedia

Populated places in the Municipality of Ivančna Gorica